Errigo is a surname. Notable people with the surname include:

Arianna Errigo (born 1988), Italian fencer
Joseph Errigo (1938–2020), American politician

Surnames of German origin
Italian-language surnames